Who Will Teach Your Child? is a 1948 Canadian short documentary, directed by Stanley Jackson for the National Film Board of Canada. The film is about the importance of proper training for elementary and high school teachers, mixing commentary with dramatic enactments of various potential classroom incidents acted by real Ottawa-area students and teachers.

The film won the Canadian Film Award for Best Theatrical Short Film at the 1st Canadian Film Awards in 1949. The film was also named by Scholastic Teacher magazine as one of the ten best films about education distributed in the United States in 1949.

References

External links

Who Will Teach Your Child? at the National Film Board of Canada

1948 films
Canadian short documentary films
Best Theatrical Short Film Genie and Canadian Screen Award winners
National Film Board of Canada short films
1948 short films
Documentary films about education
1948 documentary films
Films directed by Stanley Jackson
1940s Canadian films
Canadian educational films